Under the Gun was a punk rock group founded in New York City in 1997 by Mickey Lee Ambush (vocals, rhythm guitar), Todd Anthony (vocals, lead guitar), Chrisipline (drums), and Keith Allen (bass, vocals).  Todd Anthony left shortly after the band's first few shows and was later replaced by Joe Naylor.  Naylor took over bass playing duties after Keith Allen left the band in 1999.

Under The Gun, who named themselves after a song by the Circle Jerks, recorded two albums.  The first, Nowhere to Run, was produced by Dave Smalley of Dag Nasty and Roger Miret of Agnostic Front, and was released on Mendit Records in 1999.  Their second album, One Nation, was produced by Miret and was released in 2000 on Fastmusic Records.

Chrisipline left the band in April 2000 and was replaced by Joe Ferraro.  The band only lasted for a few more shows after the new drummer joined and disbanded by the end of the year.  In 2002, Under The Gun reunited, this time with Joe back on bass, a new lead guitar player, SEJ, and Chris and Mickey resuming their previous duties.  Chris left again shortly thereafter, and Joe moved to the drums.  Chuck Francis took over on bass, and after a few shows, Under The Gun gave way to No Class Heroes in 2003.

Punk rock groups from New York (state)
Musical groups established in 1997
Musical groups from New York City